SUR2 may refer to:

 Sulfonylurea receptor
 Sphinganine C4-monooxygenase